Henriques waterfall (Portuguese: Cachoeira dos Henriques) is a waterfall located in the Henriques bairro of the municipality of Gonçalves, Minas Gerais, Brazil.

References

Landforms of Minas Gerais
Waterfalls of Brazil